Latha Township is located in the western part of downtown Yangon, and shares borders with Lanmadaw township in the west, Pabedan township in the east, Seikkan township and Yangon river in the south, and Dagon township in the north. It consists of ten wards and is home to three primary schools, one middle school and two high schools. Lanmadaw and Latha Townships make up the Yangon Chinatown.

Population 
Latha Township is populated with a total of  25,057 people among which 42.8% male residents and 57.2% female residents as of 2014.

Landmarks
Latha township has many colonial period buildings, many of which are protected by the city.

Gallery

References

Townships of Yangon